Cynthia Guerrera Kuhn (born 1965) is an American writer and editor of mystery fiction and a Professor of English at the Metropolitan State University of Denver.

Biography 
Kuhn was born and raised in Upstate New York and presently lives in Colorado. 

Aside from writing, she is a professor of English at Metropolitan State University of Denver, where she teaches Creative Writing, Film and Media studies, and Literature.

Awards and honors

Publications

Anthologies edited 
 Styling Texts: Dress and Fashion in Literature, edited alongside Cindy L. Carlson (2007)
 Reading Chuck Palahniuk: American Monsters and Literary Mayhem, edited alongside Lance Rubin (2009)

Lila Maclean Academic Mystery series 
 The Semester of Our Discontent (2016)
 The Art of Vanishing (2017)
 The Spirit in Question (2018)
 The Subject of Malice (2019)
 The Study of Secrets (2020)

Short stories 
 "The Blue Ribbon" in Malice Domestic 14: Mystery Most Edible

Standalone books 
 Self-Fashioning in Margaret Atwood's Fiction: Dress, Culture, and Identity (2005)

Starlit Bookshop Mystery series 
 How to Book a Murder (2021)
 In the Event of Murder (expected 2023)
 Save the Date for Murder (expected TBD)

References

External links 
 Official website

21st-century American women writers
Metropolitan State University of Denver
Writers from New York (state)
1965 births
Living people